Dom otkykha 'Krasny Yar' is a rural locality at holiday house, Kishertsky District, Perm Krai, Russia. The population was 149 as of 2010.

Geography 
It is located 25 km southeast of Ust-Kishert (the district's administrative centre) by road.

References 

Rural localities in Kishertsky District